The Olympic class is a series of six container ships built for Mediterranean Shipping Company (MSC). The ships have a maximum theoretical capacity of 19,224 twenty-foot equivalent units (TEU). The ships were built by Daewoo Shipbuilding and Marine Engineering (DSME).

List of ships

See also

References 

Container ship classes
Ships built by Daewoo Shipbuilding & Marine Engineering